Anders Sandøe Ørsted, also written as Anders Sandoe Oersted or Anders Sandö Örsted (21 June 1816 – 3 September 1872) was a Danish botanist, mycologist, zoologist and marine biologist. He was the nephew of physicist Hans Christian Ørsted and of politician Anders Sandøe Ørsted.

Career
In his early career, he published on Danish and Arctic nematodes and on the zonation of marine algae in Øresund.

Between 1845 and 1848, he travelled extensively in Central America and the Caribbean and published numerous papers on the flora, concentrating on the plant families Acanthaceae and Fagaceae.  One of his better known publications is L'Amérique Centrale.

He was appointed professor of botany at the University of Copenhagen in 1851, a post he held until 1862. He was succeeded by Ferdinand Didrichsen.

His studies of what has since been known as juniper-pear rust showed that this fungus annually switches between two hosts; Juniperus sabina is the primary (telial) host and pear, Pyrus communis, is the secondary (aecial) host. He thus was the first to discover that some plant-parasitic fungi are heteroecious. These studies were continued on other Gymnosporangium species. 

The orchid genus Oerstedella Reichenbach f. is named for him.

He is the author of several hundred plant names still in use.

References

External links

Københavns Universitet: Anders Sandöe Örsted
View digitized titles by Anders Sandøe Ørsted in Botanicus.org

19th-century Danish botanists
19th-century Danish zoologists
Danish mycologists
Danish marine biologists
Botanists active in Central America
Botanists active in the Caribbean
1816 births
1872 deaths
University of Copenhagen alumni
Academic staff of the University of Copenhagen
People from Langeland Municipality